The BMW G 310 GS is an light-weight dual-sport motorcycle developed jointly by BMW and TVS Motor Company of India. It is a sister model of the BMW G 310 R.

History
In 2013 BMW announced they were collaborating with motorcycle manufacturer TVS for production of a series of sub-500 cc bikes in Tamil Nadu. These motorcycles were targeted for developing markets, markets with prominence of lower displacement bikes, and as entry-level sport bikes in developed markets. This was the first time that BMW Motorrad ventured into developing the sub-500 cc bikes.

BMW K03 was the code-name given to the first collaborative product of BMW-TVS. It was a test bike which was developed in India and sent to Germany for further testing and modifications.

In October 2015 in Brazil, the BMW G 310 Stunt was the first concept bike unveiled by BMW Motorrad.

Specifications
It has self start, static rev limiter, counterbalance shaft, wet sump, and electronic fuel injection and requires at least 91 RON petrol. It is compatible with up to 15% ethanol.

It has a side-mounted inclined exhaust, a kickstand sensor, and a plastic skid plate.

The instrument panel consist of a monochrome LCD display with onboard computer, speedometer, tachometer, fuel level, gear indicator, and clock. 

The graphics are implemented using decals.

It has a pillion seat, pillion footrests, but no pillion backrest. It also has a rear luggage rack.

The G 310 GS has a length of 2075 mm, width of 8800 mm and height of 1230 mm, a wheelbase of 1420 mm, and a seat height of 835 mm. It has an upside down fork and a mono rear shock absorber with adjustable preload. The bike has a front 110/80 R19 and a rear 150/70 R17 Metzeler Tourance radial tubeless tyre and 5-spoke alloy rims. The braking of the bike features switchable dual-channel anti-lock braking system until the 2021 refresh, with the front using a single 300 mm disc, radially-bolted 4-piston fixed caliper brake and the rear, a single 240 mm disc, single-piston floating caliper brake. It has an axial front master brake cylinder. The brakes are made by ByBre.

2021 facelift
Since 2021, it is Euro 5 compliant and has an unswitchable dual-channel anti-lock braking system Idle Speed Control, electronic throttle control, and an assist-and-slipper clutch, as well as adjustable levers, LED headlight and indicators.

2022 facelift

References

G310GS
Dual-sport motorcycles